Mugguru Monagallu may refer to:

 Mugguru Monagallu (1994 film), a 1994 Telugu-language film
 Mugguru Monagallu (2021 film), a 2021 Telugu-language film

See also 

 Monagallaku Monagadu, a 1966 Telugu-language film
 Mugguru, a 2011 Telugu-language film
 Mugguru Maratilu, a 1946 Telugu-language film
 Mugguru Kodukulu, a 1988 Telugu-language film
 Muggur, an Icelandic painter